WhatsOnStage.com is a London-based website that provides information about, and offers tickets for, theatrical performances in the United Kingdom. It also organizes the annual WhatsOnStage Awards. Founded in 1996, it has been owned by the American company TheaterMania.com since January 2013. Its chief operating officer is Sita McIntosh.

See also
WhatsOnStage Awards

References

External links
 

1996 establishments in the United Kingdom
Internet properties established in 1996
Theatre information and review websites
Theatre in the United Kingdom